Mr. Terrific is an American television sitcom that aired on CBS on Mondays at 8:00 p.m., from January 9 to August 28, 1967. Stephen Strimpell starred in the title role. A similar series on NBC, Captain Nice, also aired that season on Mondays, at 8:30 p.m.

The show was an attempt to capitalize on the "camp superhero" craze sparked by the success of the 1966 Batman TV series.

Premise
Riding the tide of the camp superhero craze of the 1960s, the show's premise involved gas station attendant Stanley Beamish (Strimpell), a mild-mannered scrawny youth who secretly worked to fight crime for a government organization, "The Bureau of Secret Projects," in Washington. All he needed to do was to take a "power pill" which gave him the strength of a thousand men and enabled him to fly, much like Superman, albeit by furious flapping while wearing the top half of a wingsuit. To the often-lamented misfortune of the Bureau of Secret Projects, he was the only person on whom the pills worked. It was established that, although the pill would give him high strength levels, he was still vulnerable to bullets. Furthermore, each power pill had a time limit of one hour (like Underdog and DC Comics's Hourman), although he generally had two 10-minute booster pills available per episode. Much of the show's humor revolved around the tendency of the amiable yet gullible Beamish to lose Mr. Terrific's powers at inopportune times, before he completed his given assignment.

Beamish's government employers were Mr. Barton J. Reed and Mr. Harley Trent, and his day-job partner at the service station was Hal Walters. Beamish was sworn to secrecy concerning his alter-ego and super-powers.

Alan Young, who had just completed his run as Wilbur Post on Mister Ed, was the original choice to play Stanley H. Beamish, and appeared in the original 1966 unaired version of the pilot, which featured a different supporting cast (Edward Andrews as The Chief, All Checco as Dr. Kramer, Dick Merrifield as Tony Lawrence, Sheilah Wells as Gloria Dickinson, and Jesse White as Mr. Finney).

Cast members
 Stanley Beamish/Mister Terrific: Stephen Strimpell.
 Barton J. Reed: John McGiver.
 Hal Walters: Dick Gautier.
 Harley Trent: Paul Smith.

Episode list

The Pill Caper
 Episodes 1, 3, 5 and 9 of Mr. Terrific were edited together and combined with new footage filmed in 1967 to create a movie titled The Pill Caper, which was released in 1967. Hal Smith has a cameo in The Pill Caper as a passenger on a train.

DVD release
The entire 17-episode series of Mr. Terrific was released commercially on DVD by Ufa/DVD in Germany under the title Immer wenn er Pillen nahm (Whenever He Took Pills) on July 17, 2009. The episodes can be heard in the original English, or in German.

References

External links
 
 Episode list

CBS original programming
1960s American sitcoms
1967 American television series debuts
1967 American television series endings
Parody superheroes
Television series by Universal Television
American superhero comedy television series